Academy of Applied Arts (abbreviated AAA ) is a single subject applied arts school specializing into the realm of Interior Design and its faculties. It is Headquartered at New Delhi  and was founded in 2010. The Academy of Applied Arts is recognized by the NIESBUD (National Institute for Entrepreneurship and Small Business Development), an autonomous institute under the Ministry of Skill Development and Entrepreneurship, Government of India.

Academy of Applied Arts  offers multiple options on courses in Interior Design which can be taken online or on campus. Academy has 3 campuses as of now in NCR at Ring Road Lajpat Nagar, YWCA(Dwarka) & Mewar University(Ghaziabad).

History 
The institute was established in 2010.

Courses Offered
The institute offers courses both at graduate and postgraduate levels on Campus and Virtual Learning options.

 List of institutions of higher education in Delhi

References

Educational institutions established in 2010
Art schools in India
Universities and colleges in Delhi
Design schools in India
2010 establishments in Delhi